The Timor imperial pigeon (Ducula cineracea) is a species of bird in the family Columbidae. It is found on Timor and Wetar. Its natural habitats are subtropical or tropical dry forests and subtropical or tropical moist montane forests. It is threatened by habitat loss.

References

External links
BirdLife Species Factsheet: Ducula cineracea (Timor imperial pigeon)

Timor imperial pigeon
Birds of Timor
Birds of Wetar
Near threatened animals
Near threatened biota of Asia
Near threatened biota of Oceania
Timor imperial pigeon
Taxonomy articles created by Polbot